Cassinopsis is a genus of Afrotropical plants, generally placed in the family Icacinaceae. They are lanky, evergreen shrubs or small trees that favour well-watered areas. They may carry spines and the leaves have an opposite arrangement. The genus name suggests its resemblance to the genus Cassine.

Species
The genus contains some six to seven species, including:
 Cassinopsis chapelieri
 Cassinopsis ciliata
 Cassinopsis ilicifolia
 Cassinopsis madagascariensis
 Cassinopsis tinifolia
 Cassinopsis tomentosa

References

 
Asterid genera
Taxa named by Otto Wilhelm Sonder